The Sports Emmy Award for Outstanding Studio Show was first awarded in 1988. One sports studio show, whether a pregame or a nightly news show, was honored each year. In 2001, the category was split into two subcategories — Outstanding Studio Show, Daily and Outstanding Studio Show, Weekly, thus awarding two shows annually.

Outstanding Studio Show
1989: NFL GameDay (ESPN)
1990: The NFL Today (CBS)
1991: SportsCenter (ESPN)
1992: NFL GameDay (ESPN) / NFL Live (NBC)
1993: The NFL Today (CBS)
1994: The NFL Today (CBS)
1995: NFL GameDay (ESPN)
1996: NFL GameDay (ESPN) / Fox NFL Sunday (FOX)
1997: SportsCenter (ESPN)
1998: Fox NFL Sunday (FOX)
1999: Fox NFL Sunday (FOX)
2000: MLB on Fox: Pregame Show (FOX)
2001: Fox NFL Sunday (FOX)

Outstanding Studio Show, Daily
2002: Inside the NBA (TNT/TBS)
2003: Baseball Tonight (ESPN)
2004: SportsCenter (ESPN)
2005: SportsCenter (ESPN)
 Baseball Tonight (ESPN)
 The Best Damn Sports Show Period (Fox Sports Net)
 Inside the NBA playoff shows (TNT)
 Outside the Lines Nightly (ESPN)
 Pardon the Interruption (ESPN)
2006: Inside the NBA playoff shows (TNT)
 Baseball Tonight (ESPN)
 The Best Damn Sports Show Period (Fox Sports Net)
 Pardon the Interruption (ESPN)
 SportsCenter (ESPN)
2007: Inside the NBA playoff shows (TNT)
 Baseball Tonight (ESPN)
 Olympic Ice (USA)
 Outside the Lines (ESPN)
 Pardon the Interruption (ESPN)
2008: Inside the NBA playoff shows (TNT)
 NASCAR Now (ESPN2)
 Pardon the Interruption (ESPN)
 SportsCenter (ESPN)
 Wimbledon Tonight (NBC)
2009: Inside the NBA playoff shows (TNT)
 Baseball Tonight (ESPN)
 MLB Postseason Studio (TBS)
 Outside the Lines First Report (ESPN)
 Pardon the Interruption (ESPN)
2010: Pardon the Interruption (ESPN)
 Inside the NBA playoff shows (TNT)
 MLB Tonight (MLB Network)
 Outside the Lines First Report (ESPN)
 SportsCenter (ESPN)
2011: MLB Tonight (MLB Network)
 Inside the NBA playoff shows (TNT)
 MLB Postseason on TBS (TBS)
 Pardon the Interruption (ESPN)
 SportsCenter (ESPN)
2012: MLB Tonight (MLB Network)
 Inside the NBA playoff shows (TNT)
 NASCAR Now (ESPN2 )
 Pardon the Interruption (ESPN)
 SportsCenter (ESPN)
 SportsNation (ESPN2)
2013: MLB Tonight (MLB Network)
 Inside the NBA playoff shows (TNT)
 NFL Live (ESPN2)
 NFL Total Access (NFL Network)
 Pardon the Interruption (ESPN)
2014: Inside the NBA playoff shows (TNT)
 MLB Tonight (MLB Network)
 Olbermann (ESPN2)
 Pardon the Interruption (ESPN)
 SportsCenter (ESPN)
2015: MLB Tonight (MLB Network)
 Inside the NBA playoff shows (TNT)
 NFL Live (ESPN2)
 Pardon the Interruption (ESPN)
 SportsCenter (ESPN)
2016: MLB Tonight (MLB Network)
 Inside the NBA (TNT)
 Major League Baseball on Fox pregame show (FOX/Fox Sports 1)
 Road to the Final Four (TBS/TNT/truTV/CBS)
 World Cup Tonight (Fox Sports 1)
2017: Pardon the Interruption (ESPN)
 Good Morning Football (NFL Network)
 MLB Tonight (MLB Network)
 NFL Total Access (NFL Network)
 The Rich Eisen Show (Audience)
2018: MLB Tonight (MLB Network)
 NHL Live (NBC/NBCSN)
 Pardon the Interruption (ESPN)
 The Dan Patrick Show (Audience/NBCSN)
 The Herd with Colin Cowherd (Fox Sports 1)
2019: Pardon the Interruption (ESPN) MLB Tonight (MLB Network)
 Outside the Lines (ESPN)
 The Dan Patrick Show (Audience/NBCSN)
 The Jump (ESPN)
2020 MLB Tonight  (MLB Network) The Dan Patrick Show (B/R Live/DirecTV/NBCSN)
 NHL Live (NBC/NBCSN)
 Outside the Lines (ESPN)
 Pardon the Interruption (ESPN)
2021:Sportscenter  (ESPN) The Dan Patrick Show (Peacock/DirecTV)
 Good Morning Football (NFL Network)
 MLB Tonight (MLB Network)
 NFL Total Access (NFL Network)
 Pardon the Interruption (ESPN)
2022:Good Morning Football  (NFL Network) The Dan Patrick Show (Peacock)
 NASCAR Race Hub (FS1)
 Pardon the Interruption (ESPN)
 The Rich Eisen Show (Peacock)
 Sportscenter  (ESPN)

Outstanding Studio Show, Weekly
2002: Sunday NFL Countdown (ESPN)
2003: Inside the NFL (HBO)
2004: Sunday NFL Countdown (ESPN)
2005: Inside the NFL (HBO)
 Fox NFL Sunday (FOX)
 MLB on Fox: Pregame Show (FOX)
 NASCAR on Fox / FX: Prerace Show (FOX/FX)
 Sunday NFL Countdown (ESPN)
2006: Inside the NFL (HBO)
 College GameDay (ESPN)
 Fox NFL Sunday (FOX)
 Inside the NBA (TNT)
 NASCAR on Fox Pre Race Show (FOX)
2007: Sunday NFL Countdown (ESPN)
 College GameDay (ESPN)
 Inside the NFL (HBO)
 NBA Nation (ABC)
 The NFL Today (CBS)
2008: College GameDay (ESPN)
 Football Night in America (NBC)
 Fox NFL Sunday (FOX)
 Inside the NBA (TNT)
 Inside the NFL (HBO)
2009: Inside the NFL (CBS/Showtime)
 College GameDay (ESPN)
 Football Night in America (NBC)
 Fox NFL Sunday (FOX)
 Monday Night Countdown (ESPN)
 Sunday NFL Countdown (ESPN)
2010: College GameDay (ESPN)
 Fox NFL Sunday (FOX)
 Inside the NBA (TNT)
 Inside the NFL (CBS/Showtime)
 Studio 42 with Bob Costas (MLB Network)
2011: College GameDay (ESPN)
 Football Night in America (NBC)
 Inside the NBA (TNT)
 NFL GameDay Morning (NFL Network)
 Studio 42 with Bob Costas (MLB Network)
2012: Inside the NBA (TNT)
 College GameDay (ESPN)
 Football Night in America (NBC)
 Inside the NFL (CBS/Showtime)
 Sunday NFL Countdown (ESPN)
2013: Inside the NFL (Showtime)
 College GameDay (ESPN)
 Football Night in America (NBC)
 Inside the NBA (TNT)
2014: College GameDay (ESPN) /  Inside the NBA (TNT)
 Fox NFL Sunday (FOX)
 Monday Night Countdown (ESPN)
 NFL GameDay Morning (NFL Network)
2015: College GameDay (ESPN)
 Football Night in America (NBC)
 Inside the NBA (TNT)
 Sunday NFL Countdown (ESPN)
2016: College GameDay (ESPN)
 Football Night in America (NBC)
 Fox NFL Sunday (FOX)
 Garbage Time with Katie Nolan (Fox Sports 1/foxsports.com)
 Inside the NBA (TNT)
2017: College GameDay (ESPN)
 Feherty (Golf Channel)
 Football Night in America (NBC)
 Inside the NBA (TNT)
 Thursday Night Kickoff (CBS/NFL Network)
2018: College GameDay (ESPN)
 Fox NFL Sunday (FOX)
 Inside the NBA (TNT)
 Monday Night Countdown (ESPN)
 The NFL Today (CBS)
2019: Inside the NBA (TNT) College GameDay (ESPN)
 Football Night in America (NBC)
 Fox NFL Sunday (FOX)
 The NFL Today (CBS)
2020: Inside the NBA (TNT) College GameDay (ESPN)
 Football Night in America (NBC)
 Fox NFL Sunday (FOX)
 Fox NFL Thursday (FOX)
2021: Inside the NBA (TNT) College GameDay (ESPN)
 Football Night in America (NBC)
 Fox NFL Sunday (FOX)
 The NFL Today (CBS)
2022: Inside the NBA (TNT) College GameDay (ESPN)
 Fox NFL Sunday (FOX)
 NFL Slimetime (Nickelodeon)
 Outside the Lines (ESPN)

Outstanding Studio Show, Limited Run
2016: Major League Baseball on Fox (2016 Playoffs) (FOX/Fox Sports 1/foxsports.com)
 Golf Central (2016 Players' Championship) (Golf Channel)
 Inside the NBA (2016 Playoffs) (TNT)
 Major League Baseball on TBS (2016 Playoffs) (TBS)
 Road to the Final Four (CBS/TBS/TNT/truTV)
2017: Major League Baseball on Fox (2017 Playoffs) (FOX/Fox Sports 1)
 Gruden's QB Camp (ESPN/ESPN2)
 Inside the NBA (2017 Playoffs) (TNT)
 NHL Live (2017 Stanley Cup playoffs) (NBC/NBCSN/USA Network)
 Road to the Final Four (CBS/TBS/TNT/truTV)
2018: Inside the NBA (2018 Playoffs) (TNT)
 Major League Baseball on Fox (2018 Playoffs) (FOX/Fox Sports 1)
 MLB Now (2018 Playoffs) (MLB Network)
 NFL Countdown (playoffs) (ESPN)
 Road to the Final Four (CBS/TBS/TNT/truTV)
 US Open preview (ESPN)

Multiple wins
10 wins
Inside the NBA

8 wins
College GameDay

7 wins
NFL GameDay/Sunday NFL Countdown

6 wins
MLB Tonight

5 wins
Inside the NFL

4 wins
Fox NFL Sunday
SportsCenter

3 wins
Major League Baseball on Fox
The NFL Today
Pardon the Interruption

Multiple nominations
27 nominations
Inside the NBA

14 nominations
College GameDay
Pardon the Interruption

13 nominations
Fox NFL Sunday

11 nominations
NFL GameDay/Sunday NFL Countdown
SportsCenter

10 nominations
MLB Tonight

9 nominations
Football Night in America
Inside the NFL

6 nominations
Major League Baseball on Fox
The NFL Today

5 nominations
Baseball Tonight
Outside the Lines/Outside the Lines First Report/Outside the Lines Nightly
The Dan Patrick Show

4 nominations
Road to the Final Four

3 nominations
MLB Postseason on TBS/MLB Postseason Studio
Monday Night Countdown

2 nominations
The Best Damn Sports Show Period
NASCAR Now
NASCAR on Fox Pre Race Show
NFL GameDay Morning
NFL Live
NFL Total Access
NHL Live
Studio 42 with Bob Costas

References

Sports Emmy Awards